Acer fenzelianum is an Asian species of maple. It has been found only in Yunnan and Vietnam.

Acer fenzelianum is a tree up to 20 meters tall with gray bark. Leaves are non-compound, moderately thick and slightly leathery, usually with 3 lobes, the central lobe much larger than the 2 small flanking lobes.

References

External links
line drawing for Flora of China figure 1 at lower right

fenzelianum
Plants described in 1933
Flora of Vietnam
Flora of Yunnan